Museum of Caricature (also known as the Eryk Lipiński Museum of Caricature) is a museum in Warsaw, Poland. The museum was founded by Eryk Lipiński in 1978, and he was the director of the museum until his death in 1991. The museum has a collection of over 20,000 pieces by Polish and foreign artists.

The museum's premises are an old orangery which was once part of the 18th century Prymas Castle.  As the museum only has limited space it does not have a permanent collection on display but instead shows temporary exhibitions based on its holdings. The museum's archives are an open resource to anybody who is interested in the history of caricature.

Artists in the museum's collection include:

 William Hogarth
 Honoré Daumier
 Jean Effel
 Herbert Sandberg
 Roland Topor
 Franciszek Kostrzewski
 Kazimierz Sichulski
 Zbigniew Czermański
 Bronisław Wojciech Linke
 Jerzy Zaruba
 Maja Berezowska
 Eryk Lipiński
 Julian Bohdanowicz
 Andrzej Czeczot
 Andrzej Dudziński
 Jerzy Flisak
 Zbigniew Jujka
 Szymon Kobyliński
 Andrzej Krauze
 Zbigniew Lengren
 Edward Lutczyn
 Andrzej Mleczko
 Sławomir Mrożek
 Janusz Stanny
 Jacek Gawłowski
 Marek Raczkowski
 Henryk Sawka

References

External links 
 

Art museums and galleries in Poland
Art museums established in 1978
Museum of Caricature, Warsaw
Cartooning museums
Museums in Warsaw
Polish satire
1978 establishments in Poland